Olon Süme (or Olon Süme-yin Tor) is an archaeological site in northern Darhan Muminggan United Banner of Baotou prefecture level city, Inner Mongolia, China.  Since the 1930s the site has been identified as the northern capital of the medieval Ongut kings.  A collection of small artefacts from the site was exhibited and published in Japan in 2003.  More recently the Chinese government has begun developing the site as a tourist destination.

References

Archaeological sites in China
Tourist attractions in Baotou